Perpète Evrard (1662–1727) was a Flemish painter of portraits and miniatures, born at Dinant and employed at several foreign courts. He died at the Hague in 1727.

References

 

1662 births
1727 deaths
17th-century Flemish painters
18th-century Flemish painters
Flemish portrait painters
Portrait miniaturists
People from Dinant